The  is a technology college in Niihama, Ehime, Japan. Established in 1962, it combines high school and college into a five-year course.

The college offers undergraduate courses in Mechanical Engineering, Electrical Engineering and Information Science, Electronic Control Engineering, 
Applied
Chemistry and
Biotechnology, and
Environmental
Materials
Engineering, as well as three advanced engineering courses.

External links
 Niihama National College of Technology English page

Japanese national universities
Universities and colleges in Ehime Prefecture
1962 establishments in Japan
Educational institutions established in 1962
Niihama, Ehime